Penicillium rubens is a species of fungus in the genus Penicillium and was the first species known to produce the antibiotic penicillin. It was first described by Philibert Melchior Joseph Ehi Biourge in 1923. For the discovery of penicillin from this species Alexander Fleming shared the Nobel Prize in Physiology or Medicine in 1945. The original penicillin-producing type has been variously identified as Penicillium rubrum, P. notatum, and P. chrysogenum among others, but genomic comparison and phylogenetic analysis in 2011 resolved that it is P. rubens. It is the best source of penicillins and produces benzylpenicillin (G), phenoxymethylpenicillin (V) and octanoylpenicillin (K). It also produces other important bioactive compounds such as andrastin, chrysogine, fungisporin, roquefortine, and sorbicillins.

History 
A French microbiologist Philibert Melchior Joseph Ehi Biourge was the first to describe P. rubens in 1923. The medicinal importance was discovered by Alexander Fleming, a physician at St Mary's Hospital, London. In September 1928, Fleming found that one of his bacterial cultures (of Staphylococcus aureus) was contaminated with mould, and that the area around the mould inhibited bacterial growth. He gave the name penicillin for the purported antibacterial substance produced by the mould. After a series of experimental tests, he published his discovery in the June 1929 issue of the British Journal of Experimental Pathology. With the help of his colleague Charles J. La Touche, Fleming identified the fungus as Penicillium rubrum.

But Charles Thom at the U. S. Department of Agriculture, Peoria, Illinois, compared the specimen with his collection of Penicillium species, and corrected the species as P. notatum. In his publication in 1931, he resolved that P. notatum was a member of P. chrysogenum species complex, which he had described in 1910. P. notatum was described by Swedish chemist Richard Westling in 1811. Thom adopted and popularised the use of P. chrysogenum. After discovery of other new species and taxonomic reexamination, three species, P. notatum, P. meleagrinum, and P. cyaneofulvum were recognised as P. chrysogenum. The Seventeenth International Botanical Congress held in Vienna, Austria, in 2005 adopted the name P. chrysogenum as the conserved name (nomen conservandum).

Whole genome sequence and phylogenetic analysis, particularly using β-tubulin sequences, in 2011 showed that P. notatum is P. rubens, and that P. chrysogenum is a different species.

Biology 

P. rubens is a common fungus of indoor environment. Along with Cladosporium halotolerans and Aspergillus niger, it is one of the nuisance moulds when humidity is high. It is the most resilient mould as it needs less water for growth and propagation. It has a soft and velvety surface. The spore-bearing filaments, conidiophores are smooth and measure 200-300 µm in length. The hairy surface, penicilli are 8-12 µm long. The conidia are smooth-walled, ellipsoidal in shape, measuring 2.5-4.0 µm long, and are blue or bluish-green in colour. It exists in a number of strains, of which the most important are Fleming's strain  (designated CBS 205.57 or NRRL 824 or IBT 30142) from which the first penicillin was discovered and the Wisconsin strain (NRRL1951) obtained from a cantaloupe in Peoria, Illinois, in 1944 and has been used for industrial production of penicillin G. The original Wisconsin strain itself has been produced in a variety of strains.

Genome 
P. rubens has four chromosomes. The genome of the Wisconsin strain has been most studied. The nuclear genome of 54-1255 strain, regarded as low-penicillin producer, has a size of 32.19 Mb. There are 13,653 open reading frames (ORFs), including 592 probable pseudogenes and 116 truncated ORFs. Three genes, namely pcbAB, pcbC, and penDE constitute the core sites for penicillin biosynthesis. They are distributed in clusters among other  (ORFs) in a 58.8 kb region, on chromosome 2. pcbAB encodes an enzyme α-aminoadipoyl-L-cysteinyl-D-valine synthetase, pcbC encodes isopenicillinN (IPN) synthase, and penDE, encoding acyl-CoA:isopenicillinN acyltransferase. The high penicillin-producing strain, NCPC10086, has slightly larger genome of 32.3 Mb, with about 13,290 protein-coding genes. There are at least 69 genes not present in 54-1255 strain. The gene Pch018g00010 that codes for enzymes in glutathione metabolism is considered as the key factor in enhanced penicillin production of this strain.

The mitochondrial genome consists of 31,790 bp and 17 ORFs. Enzymes synthesised from the nuclear genome are not sufficient for complete synthesis of penicillin. Enzymes of the final biosynthetic pathway such as acyl-CoA:isopenicillinN acyltransferase28 and phenylacetyl-CoA ligase are synthesised in separate cell organelles called microbodies (peroxisomes). The peroxisome gene pex11 is essential for controlling the amount of penicillin synthesis; the more the gene is activated (expressed), the more the penicillins.

Uses 
P. rubens is the principal source of a class of antibiotics, penicillins. The species produces three such compounds, benzylpenicillin (G), phenoxymethylpenicillin (V) and octanoylpenicillin (K). Penicillin G is the first naturally occurring compound isolated and used as an antibiotic. It is also the source of cephalosporins.

References

Fungi described in 1923
Penicillium
Penicillins
Medicinal fungi
History of medicine
History of pharmacy
Antibiotics